"Reasons to Quit" is a song recorded by American country music artists Merle Haggard and Willie Nelson.  It was released in January 1983 as the first single from the album Pancho & Lefty.  The song reached #6 on the Billboard Hot Country Singles & Tracks chart.  The song was written by Haggard.

Chart performance

References

1983 singles
1983 songs
Merle Haggard songs
Willie Nelson songs
Songs written by Merle Haggard
Song recordings produced by Chips Moman
Epic Records singles